Ben Curry (born  in Hounslow, England) is an English professional rugby union player who plays as a flanker for Sale Sharks in Premiership Rugby.

Club career 
Curry made his professional debut against Wasps on 4 November 2016 in the Anglo-Welsh Cup. At the end of the 2016-17 season, he was named a joint recipient of Sale Sharks' Young Player of the Season award, sharing the award with his brother Tom. In September 2020 Curry started for the Sale side that defeated Harlequins in the final of the Premiership Rugby Cup.

International career 
Curry was named in the England U20 squad for the 2016/17 season on 14 October 2016, having previously represented England U18. Curry was part of the England U20 squad that won the Grand Slam in the 2017 Six Nations Under 20 Championship. He was selected as the England U20 captain for the 2018 World Rugby Under 20 Championship on 29 May 2018. England finished as runners up to hosts France.

He was called up to the senior England squad by Eddie Jones for their 2017 summer tour of Argentina, but did not make an appearance on the tour. In June 2021 he was included in the senior squad again and on 4 July 2021 made his debut off the bench against the United States at Twickenham.

Personal life 
Curry is the twin brother of Sale Sharks flanker Tom Curry, nephew of former England hooker John Olver and cousin of former Northampton Saints fly-half Sam Olver. John Olver also taught at Oundle School where Ben Curry was educated. Curry was educated at Bishop Heber High School in Cheshire. He has been in a relationship with social influencer Annie Knowles since July 2019.

References

External links
 

1998 births
Living people
English rugby union players
England international rugby union players
Sale Sharks players
Rugby union flankers
People educated at Oundle School
Rugby union players from Hounslow